Grindelia robinsonii is a North American species of flowering plants in the family Asteraceae. It is native to northeastern Mexico, found only the states of Hidalgo and San Luis Potosí.

References

robinsonii
Plants described in 1942
Flora of Nuevo León